The Family D'Alembert series is a set of science fiction novels by Stephen Goldin, the first of which was expanded from the 1964 novella The Imperial Stars by E. E. "Doc" Smith. The series later served as the basis for Goldin's series Agents of ISIS.

Plot
Jules and Yvette D'Alembert are a brother and sister team of aerialists in the D'Alembert family Circus of the Empire and also work as agents in SOTE, "The Service of The Empire", the imperial intelligence agency.

Series
The series comprises the following books:

 Imperial Stars (1976)
 Stranglers' Moon (1976)
 The Clockwork Traitor (1976)
 Getaway World (1977)
 Appointment at Bloodstar, also known as The Bloodstar Conspiracy (1978)
 The Purity Plot (1978)
 Planet of Treachery (1981)
 Eclipsing Binaries (1983)
 The Omicron Invasion (1984)
 Revolt of the Galaxy (1985)

References

External links 

 
 The Family d'Alembert Series — Description of the series's history on the author's homepage.

Science fiction book series